J. B. Knight House is listed on the National Register of Historic Places and located in the city of Hopkinsville, Kentucky.

National Register of Historic Places in Christian County, Kentucky
Hopkinsville, Kentucky
Houses on the National Register of Historic Places in Kentucky
Houses in Christian County, Kentucky